Bifrenaria vitellina is a species of orchid found in Brazil.

vitellina